Scopula submutata, the Mediterranean lace border, is a moth of the family Geometridae. It is found in southern Europe, North Africa and the Near East. The habitat consists of open, dry grassland and rocky slopes.

There are two generations per year, with adults on wing from May to October.

The larvae feed on Thymus species and Origanum vulgare.

Subspecies
Scopula submutata submutata (south-eastern Europe)
Scopula submutata gedrensis Hausmann, 2003 (Liguria, southern France)
Scopula submutata nivellearia (Wehrli, 1926) (Mallorca, Spain, Portugal)
Scopula submutata roseonitens Wagner, 1926 (Pyrenees)
Scopula submutata submutulata Rebel, 1902
Scopula submutata taftanica Brandt, 1941 (Iran)
Scopula submutata taurilibanotica Wehrli, 1932 (Cyprus)
Scopula submutata transcaspia Prout, 1935

References

Moths described in 1828
Moths of Europe
Moths of Asia
Moths of Africa
submutata
Taxa named by Georg Friedrich Treitschke